Vaejovis carolinianus, the Southern Unstriped Scorpion, also known as the Southern Devil Scorpion, is a species of scorpion in the family Vaejovidae.

References

Further reading

External links

 

Vaejovidae
Animals described in 1805
Scorpions of North America